UEA may stand for:

Universities 
 University of East Africa, established in June 1963 and split, in 1970, into:
 Makerere University in Kampala, Uganda
 University of Dar es Salaam in Tanzania
 University of Nairobi in Kenya
 University of East Anglia, established in 1963 in Norwich, England
 Amazonas State University, a university in Manaus, Brazil, established in 2001
 University of East Asia, established in 1981 and renamed the University of Macau in 1991

Other uses 
 Universal Esperanto Association,, the worldwide organization of the Esperanto movement
 Universal enveloping algebra, a mathematical object
 Utah Education Association, the teachers' union in Utah
 Uea, a Melanesian island in the Rotuma group, a dependency of Fiji 
 In biology, an abbreviation for "Ulex europaeus agglutinin" (or "Ulex europaeus lectin"), the lectin of the gorse species Ulex europaeus
 Chengdu Airlines (also known as United Eagle Airlines) with ICAO code UEA.
 Uea Point, an area on Tutuila Island in American Samoa